Théah is the fictional world created for the 7th Sea tabletop roleplaying game and  collectible card game, created by John Wick and Jennifer Wick. It is based on an alternate version of early modern Europe with nations matching different periods and legends. There is also a heady undercurrent of secret societies based on real world and fictional sources.

History
The 7th Sea role-playing game was centered on the swashbuckling genre, set on the fictional world of Théah.

Nations of Théah 
 Avalon  The England of Théah is based equally on Elizabethan England and the Arthurian legends. Queen Elaine rules the Three Kingdoms (Avalon, Innismore, and the Highland Marches) from the mystical city of Carleon using the symbol of the Graal to represent her unified rule.
 Castille  The Spain of Théah is the stronghold of the Vaticine church (more Gnostic than Catholic) where the masked El Vago fights the injustice of the Inquisition.
 Eisen  The Seven Kingdoms of Théah's equivalent to the various nation-states that would become Germany were once united into a Holy Roman Empire but now lie war-torn and divided after a religious-based civil war equivalent to the Thirty Years' War.
 Montaigne  The France of Théah was home to the decadent empire of the glorious Sun King Leon Alexandre du Montaigne but now having gone through the throes of a bloody French Revolution is the first republic in Théah.
 Ussura  The icy parable of Russia lies on the brink of modernisation and the transition from the iron grip of the Gaius (like Ivan the Terrible) to the reformation of Catherine the Great.
 Vendel  The Dutch and Scandinavian cultures are in schism between the merchant Guilds and the ancient warrior traditions of the Vestenmannavnjar (Vikings).
 Vodacce  The Italian city-states are represented by the fracture and fractious islands of the scheming Merchant Princes all following the tenets of The Great Game.
 Cathay  Théah's parallel to China and the Orient is separated from the rest of the world by the mysterious Wall of Fire.
 Crescent Empire  Sand, scimitars and other archetypal Middle Eastern fare.

Secret societies 
 The Knights of the Rose & Cross  A mixture of the Knights Templar with the Rosicrucians and a touch of the Masons, they try to inspire the populace with their heroic deeds.
 Die Kreuzritter  The Black Crosses are the successors to the Teutonic Knights who fought in the Crusades and now fight a shadowy war against an alien threat.
 Explorer's Society  The archaeologists and explorers of Théah are for any budding "Indiana Jones" as they explore the ancient Syrneth cultures that predate mankind.
 Invisible College  Based on the real-world association of scholars that became the Royal Society, they work in secret due to the rise of the Inquisition.
 Los Vagos  The followers of El Vago (Zorro) help to uphold justice and freedom in Castille under the persecution of the Inquisition
 The Rilasciare  Seen as small collections of anarchists and troublemakers, the group is far older and more organised than anyone realises.
 Sophia's Daughters  Descendants of an ancient Sidhe bloodline, the group are secret guardians of Théah with powers of foresight and manipulation.
 Novus Ordum Mundi  The evil overlord club is a collection of some of the most villainous members of Théan society who have schemed and manipulated for many centuries.
 The Rye Grin  A new organization founded during the Montaigne Revolution trying to save innocents from the guillotine.

References

Fantasy worlds
Campaign settings